Charles James Murray (29 November 1851 – 25 September 1929) was a British Conservative Party politician and diplomat.

Early life

He was the son of The Hon. Sir Charles Augustus Murray and his American born wife Elizabeth "Elise" Wadsworth. His parents met while his father was spending several years travelling across Europe and America between 1835 and 1838. His father returned to England in 1838 where his father obtained the position of Master of the Household in the Court of the young Queen Victoria. After being removed from the positions in the Household reforms initiated by Albert, Prince Consort, his father became a diplomat in Naples followed by consul-general in Egypt in 1846. His parents married in December 1850 during one of his father's visits to Scotland. While in Cairo, his mother tragically died after giving birth to him. His father later served as Minister to the Swiss Confederation, and Envoy to the Shah of Persia and the King of Saxony. In 1862, his father remarried to his first cousin once removed Hon. Edith Susan Esther Fitzpatrick (a daughter of John Fitzpatrick, 1st Baron Castletown). From this marriage, Charles had a much younger half-brother, Cecil Henry Alexander Murray.

His paternal grandparents were George Murray, 5th Earl of Dunmore and the former Lady Susan Hamilton (a daughter of Archibald Hamilton, 9th Duke of Hamilton). His paternal uncle was Alexander Murray, 6th Earl of Dunmore and among his paternal cousins were Lady Susan Catherine Mary Murray (wife of James Carnegie, 9th Earl of Southesk), Lady Constance Euphemia Woronzow Murray (wife of William Elphinstone, 15th Lord Elphinstone), and Charles Murray, 7th Earl of Dunmore. His maternal grandparents were prominent landowner and businessman James Wadsworth. His maternal uncle, James S. Wadsworth, was a Union Army General during the American Civil War. Among his American cousins were Cornelia Wadsworth Adair (who married Scots-Irish businessman John George Adair and became matriarch of Glenveagh Castle in County Donegal, Ireland), U.S. Representative James Wolcott Wadsworth, and Elizabeth Wadsworth, who married Arthur Smith-Barry (later Baron Barrymore).

Career
Murray was elected as a Member of Parliament (MP) for Hastings in 1880, a position he resigned in 1883. He was elected Member of Parliament for Coventry in 1895 until he retired at the 1906 general election.

He later served as Third Secretary of the Diplomatic Service and was officer in the Ross and Cromarty Mountain Battery, Royal Garrison Artillery. Between 1917 and 1918, he fought in the World War I and was awarded the Officier de Mérite Agricole.

Personal life
On 9 August 1875, Murray was married to Lady Anne Francesca Wilhelmina Finch, a daughter of Heneage Finch, 6th Earl of Aylesford and the former Jane Wightwick Knightley (the only daughter and heiress of John Wightwick Knightley of Offchurch Bury). Her brothers, Heneage and Charles, both succeeded their father as the 7th and 8th Earl of Aylesford. Together, they lived at Lochcarron, Ross-shire in Scotland and were the parents of:

 Sybil Louisa Murray (1876–1957), who married Hon. Claude Henry Comaraich Willoughby, a younger son of Henry Willoughby, 8th Baron Middleton, in 1904.
 Lieutenant Alastair Heneage Murray (1878–1900), who died at Senekal, South Africa from wounds received in action during the Boer War.
 Charles Wadsworth Murray (1894–1945), who married Elizabeth Grant, daughter of Frank Grant, in 1924.

Murray died on 25 September 1929. His widow, Lady Anne, died on 10 January 1933.

Descendants
Through his daughter Sybil, he was a grandfather of Henry Douglas Willoughby (1908–1908), Mary Bridget Willoughby (1910–2003) (who married Lt.-Gen. Sir Edward Dacre Howard-Vyse in 1940) and Joan Lavinia Willoughby (1913–1989) (who married Harry Nettleton in 1960).

Through his son Charles, he was a grandfather of Helen Rosemary Murray (b. 1928), who married Hubert Zipperlen in 1966.

References

External links 
 

1851 births
1929 deaths
Conservative Party (UK) MPs for English constituencies
UK MPs 1880–1885
UK MPs 1895–1900
UK MPs 1900–1906
Wadsworth family